is a maxi single released by the J-pop singer Kotoko. It is her first single not to be produced by I've Sound. It was released on June 24, 2009, the same release date of her I've Sound single "'snIpe". "Ao-Iconoclast" was used as the theme song for game BlazBlue: Calamity Trigger. Although the song was replaced by "Hekira no Sora e Izanaedo" (also by Kotoko) in the game's sequel, BlazBlue: Continuum Shift, "Ao-Iconoclast" remains available in the game as an optional BGM.

This single's catalog number is GNCA-0129. Both songs are produced by Ayumi Miyazaki.

Track listing 
—4:54
Lyrics: Kotoko
Composition: Yugo Sasakura
Arrangement: Ayumi Miyazaki
PIGEON-the green-ey'd monster- -- 4:15
Lyrics: Kotoko
Composition/Arrangement: Ayumi Miyazaki
—4:54
PIGEON-the green-ey'd monster- (Instrumental) -- 4:11

Charts and sales

References

2009 singles
Kotoko (singer) songs
2009 songs